Beschreibung eines Sommers is an East German film directed by Ralf Kirsten. It was released in 1962.

References

External links
 

1963 films
East German films
1960s German-language films
1960s German films